Jore may refer to:

People
 Jore Trompet (born 1992), Belgian football player
 Léonce Jore (1882–1975), French colonial administrator
 Rick Jore (born 1956), American politician and businessman

Places
 Jore Pokhri Wildlife Sanctuary, India

Other
 Jore (film), 2004 Indian Tamil-language action comedy film